The Ole and Polly Oleson Farmhouse is a historic house located near Portland, Oregon. It was listed on the National Register of Historic Places on February 22, 1991.

Description and history 
The house is a two-story pattern book Queen Anne/Eastlake style house situated on 1.31 acres overlooking Ames Way and Oleson Road in the Raleigh Hills area of Washington County. The acreage is dominated by many original plantings by the Oieson family. It was built in 1889–1890, apparently as a replacement for an earlier 1860s structure.

See also
 National Register of Historic Places listings in Washington County, Oregon

References

Houses in Washington County, Oregon
Houses on the National Register of Historic Places in Oregon
National Register of Historic Places in Washington County, Oregon
Queen Anne architecture in Oregon
Houses completed in 1890